Cades may refer to:

Places
Cades, South Carolina
Cades Cove, East Tennessee of U.S.
Cadesh, Ruins of an ancient citadel on the Israeli-Lebanese border
Kadesh (biblical), place on the southern border of ancient Israel

Computing
CAdES (computing), CMS Advanced Electronic Signature Format
CADES, computer software for system development

Painter
Giuseppe Cades, Italian painter and sculptor